Shumaila Qureshi (born 30 April 1988) is a Pakistani former cricketer who played as a right-arm off break bowler. She appeared in three One Day Internationals and one Twenty20 Internationals for Pakistan in 2010. She played domestic cricket for Karachi, Sindh, Balochistan, Omar Associates.

She is currently a trainer for cricket and Physical Training teacher at Alpha Core School  PECHS Branch, Karachi.

References

External links
 
 

1988 births
Living people
Cricketers from Karachi
Pakistani women cricketers
Pakistan women One Day International cricketers
Pakistan women Twenty20 International cricketers
Karachi women cricketers
Sindh women cricketers
Baluchistan women cricketers
Omar Associates women cricketers